The Interplanetary Transport Network (ITN) is a collection of gravitationally determined pathways through the Solar System that require very little energy for an object to follow.  The ITN makes particular use of Lagrange points as locations where trajectories through space can be redirected using little or no energy. These points have the peculiar property of allowing objects to orbit around them, despite lacking an object to orbit. While it would use little energy, transport along the network would take a long time.

History
Interplanetary transfer orbits are solutions to the gravitational three-body problem, which, for the general case, does not have analytical solutions, and is addressed by numerical analysis approximations. However, a small number of exact solutions exist, most notably the five orbits referred to as "Lagrange points", which are orbital solutions for circular orbits in the case when one body is significantly more massive.

The key to discovering the Interplanetary Transport Network was the investigation of the nature of the winding paths near the Earth-Sun and Earth-Moon Lagrange points. They were first investigated by Henri Poincaré in the 1890s. He noticed that the paths leading to and from any of those points would almost always settle, for a time, on an orbit about that point. There are in fact an infinite number of paths taking one to the point and away from it, and all of which require nearly zero change in energy to reach. When plotted, they form a tube with the orbit about the Lagrange point at one end.

The derivation of these paths traces back to mathematicians Charles C. Conley and Richard P. McGehee in 1968.  Hiten, Japan's first lunar probe, was moved into lunar orbit using similar insight into the nature of paths between the Earth and the Moon.  Beginning in 1997, Martin Lo, Shane D. Ross, and others wrote a series of papers identifying the mathematical basis that applied the technique to the Genesis solar wind sample return, and to lunar and Jovian missions.  They referred to it as an Interplanetary Superhighway (IPS).

Paths
As it turns out, it is very easy to transit from a path leading to the point to one leading back out. This makes sense, since the orbit is unstable, which implies one will eventually end up on one of the outbound paths after spending no energy at all. Edward Belbruno coined the term "weak stability boundary" or "fuzzy boundary" for this effect.

With careful calculation, one can pick which outbound path one wants. This turns out to be useful, as many of these paths lead to some interesting points in space, such as the Earth's Moon or between the Galilean moons of Jupiter, within a few months or years.

The transfers are so low-energy that they make travel to almost any point in the Solar System possible.  On the downside, these transfers are very slow. For trips from Earth to other planets, they are not useful for crewed or uncrewed probes, as the trip would take many generations. Nevertheless, they have already been used to transfer spacecraft to the Earth–Sun  point, a useful point for studying the Sun that was employed in a number of recent missions, including the Genesis mission, the first to return solar wind samples to Earth. The network is also relevant to understanding Solar System dynamics; Comet Shoemaker–Levy 9 followed such a trajectory on its collision path with Jupiter.

Further explanation
The ITN is based around a series of orbital paths predicted by chaos theory and the restricted three-body problem leading to and from the orbits around the Lagrange points – points in space where the gravity between various bodies balances with the centrifugal force of an object there. For any two bodies in which one body orbits around the other, such as a star/planet or planet/moon system, there are five such points, denoted  through . For instance, the Earth–Moon  point lies on a line between the two, where gravitational forces between them exactly balance with the centrifugal force of an object placed in orbit there. These five points have particularly low delta-v requirements, and appear to be the lowest-energy transfers possible, even lower than the common Hohmann transfer orbit that has dominated orbital navigation since the start of space travel.

Although the forces balance at these points, the first three points (the ones on the line between a certain large mass, e.g. a star, and a smaller, orbiting mass, e.g. a planet) are not stable equilibrium points. If a spacecraft placed at the Earth–Moon  point is given even a slight nudge away from the equilibrium point, the spacecraft's trajectory will diverge away from the  point. The entire system is in motion, so the spacecraft will not actually hit the Moon, but will travel in a winding path, off into space. There is, however, a semi-stable orbit around each of these points, called a halo orbit.

In addition to orbits around Lagrange points, the rich dynamics that arise from the gravitational pull of more than one mass yield interesting trajectories, also known as low energy transfers. For example, the gravity environment of the Sun–Earth–Moon system allows spacecraft to travel great distances on very little fuel, albeit on an often circuitous route.

Missions
Launched in 1978, the ISEE-3 spacecraft was sent on a mission to orbit around one of the Lagrange points. The spacecraft was able to maneuver around the Earth's neighborhood using little fuel by taking advantage of the unique gravity environment. After the primary mission was completed, ISEE-3 went on to accomplish other goals, including a flight through the geomagnetic tail and a comet flyby. The mission was subsequently renamed the International Cometary Explorer (ICE).

The first low energy transfer using what would later be called the ITN was the rescue of Japan's Hiten lunar mission in 1991. 

Another example of the use of the ITN was NASA's 2001–2003 Genesis mission, which orbited the Sun–Earth  point for over two years collecting material, before being redirected to the  Lagrange point, and finally redirected from there back to Earth. 

The 2003–2006 SMART-1 of the European Space Agency used another low energy transfer from the ITN. 

In a more recent example, the Chinese spacecraft Chang'e 2 used the ITN to travel from lunar orbit to the Earth-Sun  point, then on to fly by the asteroid 4179 Toutatis.

Asteroids
The asteroid 39P/Oterma's path from outside Jupiters orbit, to inside, and back to outside is said to use these low energy paths.

See also

 Gravitational keyhole
 Gravity assist
 Halo orbit
 Hill sphere
 Horseshoe orbit
 Interplanetary spaceflight
 Lunar cycler
 Mars cycler
 Orbital mechanics

References

Further reading
Dynamical Systems, the Three-Body Problem, and Space Mission Design , by Wang Sang Koon, Martin W. Lo, Jerrold E. Marsden, Shane D. Ross (book available as PDF ). 
 "Cylindrical manifolds and tube dynamics in the restricted three-body problem" - PhD dissertation by Shane D. Ross
 "The Interplanetary Transport Network"  by Shane D. Ross, American Scientist, May–June 2006 (Subscription)
 "Ride the celestial subway" New Scientist, 27 March 2006
 "Tube Route" Science, 18 November 2005
 "Navigating Celestial Currents" Science News, 18 April 2005
The Dynamical Mechanism of Ballistic Lunar Capture Transfers in the Four-Body Problem from the Perspective of Invariant Manifolds and Hill's Regions by Edward Belbruno

External links
 "Next Exit 0.5 Million Kilometers" Engineering and Science, 2002
 "Mathematics Unites The Heavens And The Atom," Space Daily, 28 September 2005
 "Asteroids Lost in Space" Physical Review Focus, 14 June 2002
 Interplanetary Transport Network lecture (YouTube) by Shane D. Ross, 2004
Capture Dynamics and Chaotic Motions in Celestial Mechanics: With the Construction of Low Energy Transfers - A mathematical analysis of aspects of the ITN, Edward Belbruno (2004)
 2007-10-08 audio interview with Belbruno on low-energy transfer

Astrodynamics
Dynamical systems
Orbits